Azad News Agency (ANA) is an Iranian news agency which was launched on May 19, 2004 at the Human Science Department of Islamic Azad University. The News-Agency is active in four languages of Persian, English, Arabic and Turkish. The owner of the agency is Islamic Azad University; and Morteza Khalafi-Zadeh is the current CEO of ANA. Hassan Karbalai was the former "chief executive officer" of it.

According to the agency head:

"Azad News Agency was launched in order to develop information dissemination and create a change in the field of university-activities...; On the other hand, ANA is organized to be active in diverse departments of (Islamic) Azad University.”

See also 
 Student News Network

References

News agencies based in Iran
Multilingual news services
Mass media in Tehran
Politics of Iran
Islamic Azad University